Eddie Jerome Fuller (born June 22, 1968) is a former professional American football running back in the National Football League for the Buffalo Bills.  He was drafted by the Bills in the 4th round (100th overall) of the 1990 NFL Draft, and played for the team from 1991 until 1993.

Fuller played college football at Louisiana State University. He caught the winning touchdown pass in the famed Earthquake Game. He was born in Leesville, Louisiana and played prep football at Leesville High School.

References

External links
 Pro-Football-Reference.com
 databaseFootball.com
 NFL Enterprises LLC
 The War Eagle Reader: Footneauxts of ‘88

1968 births
Living people
People from Leesville, Louisiana
Players of American football from Louisiana
American football running backs
LSU Tigers football players
Buffalo Bills players